D/O may refer to:
Delivery order
Disorder (medicine)